The following highways are numbered 181:

Canada
Prince Edward Island Route 181

Chile
Route 181-CH in Araucanía Region

India
 National Highway 181 (India)

Ireland
 R181 road (Ireland)

Japan
 Japan National Route 181

United Kingdom
 M181 motorway (East Butterwick-Scunthorpe)

United States
 Interstate 181 (former)
 U.S. Route 181
 Alabama State Route 181
 Arizona State Route 181
 Arkansas Highway 181
 California State Route 181
 Connecticut Route 181
 Florida State Road 181 (former)
 Georgia State Route 181 (former)
 Georgia State Route 181
 Illinois Route 181 (former)
 Iowa Highway 181 (former)
 K-181 (Kansas highway)
 Kentucky Route 181
 Louisiana Highway 181
 Maine State Route 181
 Maryland Route 181
 Massachusetts Route 181
 M-181 (Michigan highway) (former)
 Missouri Route 181
 New Jersey Route 181
 New Mexico State Road 181
 New York State Route 181 (former)
 North Carolina Highway 181
 Ohio State Route 181
 Pennsylvania Route 181
 South Carolina Highway 181
 Tennessee State Route 181
 Utah State Route 181 (former)
 Texas State Highway 181 (former)
 Texas State Highway Loop 181
 Farm to Market Road 181 (Texas)
 Virginia State Route 181
 Washington State Route 181
 Wisconsin Highway 181

Territories:
 Puerto Rico Highway 181